The Amazon.ca First Novel Award, formerly the Books in Canada First Novel Award, is a Canadian literary award, co-presented by Amazon.ca and The Walrus to the best first novel in English published the previous year by a citizen or resident of Canada. It has been awarded since 1976.

The First Novel Award was founded by the literary magazine Books in Canada. Between 1976 and 1994, the award was sponsored by  SmithBooks. During this period, the award was known as the SmithBooks/Books in Canada First Novel Award. When SmithBooks was acquired by Chapters, it became the Chapters/Books in Canada First Novel Award.

The award was reorganized when Books in Canada was acquired by Adrian and Olga Stein in 1995. The Steins retained a first novel editor, introduced a comprehensive first novel review program, and formalized the adjudication process.

The award was taken over by Amazon.com in 2009 and its name was changed to the current incarnation. The Amazon.com arrangement saw the prize award initially doubled to $10,000, and then increased to its current amount of $40,000, with shortlisted finalists each receiving over $6,000.

Winners and nominees
At different times in its history, the award has been presented early in the year for works published in the preceding year, late in the year for works published in the same year as the presentation, or mid-year for an eligibility period that straddled parts of both years. For clarity, the list below is organized by the year of presentation rather than the year of publication eligibility.

1970s

1980s

1990s

2000s

2010s

2020s

References

External links
First Novel Award at Amazon.ca

Canadian fiction awards
First book awards
Awards established in 1976
1976 establishments in Canada